Madhugiri Assembly constituency is one of the 224 constituencies in the Karnataka Legislative Assembly of Karnataka a south state of India. It is also part of Tumkur Lok Sabha constituency.

Members of Legislative Assembly

Mysore State (Koratagere Madhugiri constituency)
 1951 (Seat-1): R. Channigaramaiah, Indian National Congress
 1951 (Seat-2): Mudduramaiah, Indian National Congress

Mysore State (Madhugiri constituency)
 1957 (Seat-1): R. Channigaramaiah, Indian National Congress
 1957 (Seat-2): Mali Mariyappa, Indian National Congress

 1962: T. S. Shivanna, Praja Socialist Party

 1967: G. T. Govinda Reddy, Indian National Congress

 1972: R. Chikkaiah, Indian National Congress (Organisation)

Karnataka State
 1978: Gangahamumaiah, Indian National Congress (Indira)

 1983: Rajavardhan, Janata Party

 1985: Rajavardhan, Janata Party

 1989: G. Parameshwara, Indian National Congress

 1994: Gangahanumaiah, Janata Dal

 1999: G. Parameshwara, Indian National Congress

 2004: G. Parameshwara, Indian National Congress

 2008: D. C. Gourishankar, Janata Dal (Secular)

 2008 (By-Poll): Anitha Kumaraswamy, Janata Dal (Secular)

 2013: Kyatasandra N .Rajanna, Indian National Congress

 2018: M.V. Veerabhadraiah, Janata Dal (Secular)

See also
 List of constituencies of Karnataka Legislative Assembly
 Tumkur district

References

Assembly constituencies of Karnataka
Tumkur district